Sergio Víctor Palma (1 January 1956 – 28 June 2021) was an Argentine who was the World Boxing Association's world Super Bantamweight boxing champion from 1980 until 1982.

Professional career
Palma was born in the town of La Tigra. He made his professional debut on 15 January 1976, he fought for his first world title in 1979 when he faced Ricardo Cardona but came up just short losing a close decision. He would not waste his second opportunity when he faced reigning champion Leo Randolph the following year and stopped him in the fifth round to become WBA super bantamweight champion. His reign lasted two years before Leo Cruz beat him in a rematch for the title. After the loss, he would fight only 6 times over 8 years, finally retiring from the sport in 1990.

Death
Palma resided in Mar del Plata where he died from complications related to COVID-19 on 28 June 2021, at the age of 65.

Professional boxing record

See also
List of super-bantamweight boxing champions

References

External links

1956 births
2021 deaths
Sportspeople from Chaco Province
Argentine male boxers
Super-bantamweight boxers
World super-bantamweight boxing champions
World Boxing Association champions
Deaths from the COVID-19 pandemic in Argentina